Strepsigonia is a genus of moths belonging to the subfamily Drepaninae.

Species
Strepsigonia affinis Warren, 1897
Strepsigonia kerbau Holloway, 1998
Strepsigonia diluta (Warren, 1897)
Strepsigonia nigrimaculata Warren, 1897
Strepsigonia paludicola Holloway, 1998
Strepsigonia placida (Swinhoe, 1902)
Strepsigonia quadripunctata (Walker, 1862)
Strepsigonia robusta  Holloway, 1998

References

Drepaninae
Drepanidae genera